Julie Platt (née Beren; born 1957) is an American banker and philanthropist who has served as the chair of the Board of Trustees of the Jewish Federations of North America since 2022. She is the second woman to serve as the chair for the organization, which oversees 146 Jewish federations across the United States that distribute over $3 billion each year.

She is a member of the board of trustees of the University of Pennsylvania. She had previously served as the chair of the Jewish Federation of Los Angeles and was on the advisory board of the Ziegler School of Rabbinic Studies at American Jewish University.

Personal life
Platt earned a bachelor's degree from the University of Pennsylvania, where she met her husband, Tony- and Emmy Award-winning producer Marc Platt. The couple has five children, including Tony Award-winning actor Ben Platt.

References

1957 births
Living people
Jewish American bankers
Jewish American philanthropists